Studio Ghibli is a Japanese animation film studio founded in 1985. In addition to producing 18 feature films, the studio has produced several short films, including commercials, films for the Ghibli Museum, music videos, and works released directly to video.

Commercials
Studio Ghibli has created and produced a variety of different commercials.

Nandarō
 was a series of commercial spots for NTV which were created by Hayao Miyazaki at Studio Ghibli. The spots first aired during November 1992, and featured one 15-second spot and four 5-second spots. They have been released on both the Ghibli ga Ippai LaserDisc box set and the Ghibli ga Ippai Special Short Short DVD set.

Music videos
Studio Ghibli (and its subsidiary Studio Kajino) have created a number of music videos.

On Your Mark

 is a song by the Japanese rock duo Chage & Aska. At their request, animator Hayao Miyazaki produced a music video for the song. The music video was created in 1995, is entirely animated, has no dialogue, and runs for about six and a half minutes.  The song was used in advertisements for NEC, and was shown at the theatrical release of Whisper of the Heart in Japan.

The music video tells the story of two policemen in a possible near future who rescue a young girl with wings from the headquarters of a religious cult, and then have to rescue her from their own government.

Short films
Studio Ghibli short films have premiered on television, in theaters (usually debuting with a full-length film from the studio), at the Ghibli Museum in Mitaka, Tokyo, and directly to home video formats such as DVD and Blu-ray.

Ghiblies
 is a 12-minute short anime comedic film which aired on NTV on April 8, 2000. It was directed by Yoshiyuki Momose and produced by Hiroyuki Watanabe.

Ghiblies Episode 2
A 25-minute sequel, titled Ghiblies Episode 2, was released in theaters with The Cat Returns on July 19, 2002. Momose wrote the script and directed the sequel, with assistance directing from Eiichirō Tashiro and Chika Matsumura. Manto Watanabe, the drummer for the Okinawan band Shang Shang Typhoon, created the music for the short film. Other staff members included art director Noboru Yoshida, original character designer Toshio Suzuki, and special character designer Hisaichi Ishii. It was released on home video in North America as bonus content with Ocean Waves by GKIDS in 2017. Before that, GKIDS streamed the clip with English subtitles in United States' theaters along with the 15th anniversary screenings of Spirited Away in December 2016.

Film Guru Guru
 is an anime short film series which was shown at the Ghibli Museum from October 1, 2001 through November 17, 2008. The series was directed by Hayao Miyazaki with storyboards by Miyazaki and Hiromasa Yonebayashi (who also produced).

Characters
: Masahiko Nishimura
: Kyōka Suzuki
: Arata Furuta
: Satoru Satō
: Tomoe Shinohara
: Koji Imada
: Kaoru Kobayashi

Imaginary Flying Machines

 is an animated 2002 short film produced by Studio Ghibli for their near exclusive use in the Ghibli Museum. It features famous director Hayao Miyazaki himself as narrator (in the form of a humanoid pig, reminiscent of Porco from Porco Rosso), telling the story of flight and the many machines imagined to achieve it.

The Night of Taneyamagahara

 is an anime short film directed by Kazuo Oga and released by Studio Ghibli. A DVD version was released for Japan on July 7, 2006. The story is based on a work by Kenji Miyazawa.

Iblard Jikan

 is a Japanese animation by Studio Ghibli, released in Japan on DVD and Blu-ray on July 4, 2007 as part of the "Ghibli ga Ippai Collection." It is directed by Naohisa Inoue. The story is set in the imaginary world of Iblard, originally depicted in paintings by Inoue. The paintings of Iblard also inspired the fantasy sequences of Ghibli's Whisper of the Heart.

Zen - Grogu and Dust Bunnies
Zen - Grogu and Dust Bunnies is a Disney+ short film animation by Studio Ghibli, made as a co-production with Lucasfilm Ltd. to promote the third season of The Mandalorian and was released on November 12, 2022. The short stars Grogu as he meditates while the Soot Sprites from My Neighbor Totoro and Spirited Away interact with him.

A teaser was posted on Ghibli's Twitter page on November 10, 2022 featuring the Lucasfilm logo. It was officially announced on the 11th for an immediate release on Disney+ the following day.

Ghibli Museum short films

The following shorts films are exclusively shown on rotation at the Saturn Theater at the Ghibli Museum in Mitaka, Tokyo.

The Whale Hunt

 is a 2001 short film shown only in the Ghibli Museum in Mitaka, Japan. The film has a running time of 16 minutes. It is drawn in a different, simpler style compared to other Studio Ghibli films, and uses bright pastel colors.

Kujiraori tells the story of school children playing that they're building a boat. As imagination replaces reality, they find themselves on the ocean, hunting for a whale. A big, gentle whale shows up, accompanies them back to land and plays with them. Then the fantasy ends and the children are back in their class room.

The film was shown at the 2002 New York International Children's Film Festival. It has won the at the Ōfuji Noburō Award at the Mainichi Film Award in 2001.

Koro's Big Day Out

 is a 2002 short film written and directed by Miyazaki. It has a running time of 15 minutes.

Mei and the Kittenbus

 is a 2002 thirteen-minute sequel to My Neighbor Totoro, written and directed by Miyazaki. Chika Sakamoto, who voiced Mei in Totoro, returned to voice Mei in this short. Miyazaki himself did the voice of the Neko Ba-chan as well as Totoro. It concentrates on the character of Mei Kusakabe from the original film and her adventures one night with the Kittenbus (offspring of the Catbus from the film) and other cat-oriented vehicles.

The short is regularly shown at the Ghibli Museum, but has not been released to home video.  It was shown briefly in the United States in 2006 to honor the North American release of Spirited Away and at a Juvenile Diabetes Research Foundation fundraiser a few days later.

Water Spider Monmon

 is a 2006 Japanese animated short film produced by anime studio Studio Ghibli. It can be seen at the Ghibli Museum in Mitaka, Tokyo, Japan.

It is based in part on "Boro, the Caterpillar", a story idea which Hayao Miyazaki considered working on prior to the start of production on Princess Mononoke. The short film's main character is a diving bell spider who seems to have fallen in love with a water strider. Though she is scared of him at first, the water strider soon gets used to the presence of the spider.

The Day I Harvested a Planet

 is an animated 2006 short film produced by Studio Ghibli for their exclusive use in the Saturn Theater at the Ghibli Museum in Mitaka, Tokyo, Japan. The film is based on a story by Naohisa Inoue.

The short film is about a boy who lives and works on a farm. One day when going to sell vegetables at a market, his cart breaks down. Two strangers, a frog and a mole, offer him a strange seed in exchange for the vegetables. The boy accepts and finds that the seed grows into a miniature planet. It continues growing as he tends to it, forming an atmosphere, weather systems and life. After being taken back to the city, he meets the stranger who sold the seed to him, and they release the planet into a galaxy of similar planets, where it will grow  for years until becoming a real planet.

Looking for a House

 is a short film shown only in the Saturn Theater at the Ghibli Museum in Mitaka, Japan. Debuting in January 2006, it is 12 minutes long.

Fuki sets out with a big rucksack in high spirits on a journey to look for a new house.  Along her way, Fuki encounters and befriends numerous manifestations of the natural world, from fish to insects to a kami who resembled Totoro.  All the sound effects in this film were done by human voice. As a nod to the non-Japanese speaking audience, this short film contains little to no spoken Japanese, and the story is conveyed almost entirely through art and sound effects. Sound is also depicted on screen as animated writing.  The original story and screenplay were written by Hayao Miyazaki.

A Sumo Wrestler's Tail

 is a Japanese animated fantasy short film directed by Akihiko Yamashita and written by Hayao Miyazaki made for the Studio Ghibli Museum. It premiered at the museum in 2010. Miyazaki based the story on the Japanese folk tale Nezumi no Sumō.

Chu Zumo is the story of an old farmer who discovers a group of rats heading to a sumo wrestling bout. After they lose miserably he decides to feed the rats to boost their chances of winning.

Mr. Dough and the Egg Princess
 is a 2010 short film. It is 12 minutes long.

Treasure Hunting

 is a 2011 short film. It is 9 minutes long.

Boro the Caterpillar

 is a 2018 short film about a newly hatched caterpillar. Hayao Miyazaki created the story, wrote the screenplay, and directed the film. It is 14 minutes long. It was animated using CGI, rather than being produced with hand drawn 2D animation.

See also
List of short films

References

External links
 Detailed information on Nausicaa.net

1992 anime films
2000 anime films
2001 anime films
2002 anime films
Japanese television commercials
Drama anime and manga
Anime short films
Studio Ghibli animated films
Studio Ghibli